Ferula ammoniacum (syn. Dorema ammoniacum) is a species of flowering plant in the family Apiaceae, native to Iran, Turkmenistan, Afghanistan, and Pakistan. It is the source of Persian gum ammoniac.

References

ammoniacum
Flora of Iran
Flora of Turkmenistan
Flora of Afghanistan
Flora of Pakistan
Plants described in 2015